A Kiss in Time is Patty Griffin's fourth commercially released album, and her first live album. It was recorded on 30 January 2003, at the Ryman Auditorium in Nashville, Tennessee and released on 7 October of the same year.  The package includes a DVD which features behind the scenes footage of Griffin as well as videos of "Chief" and "Rain." According to Billboard the album debuted at number 21 on the Top Heatseekers chart and has sold 34,000 copies in the U.S. up to May 2004.

Track listing
All songs were written by Patty Griffin.
"Long Ride Home" – 4:02
"Goodbye" – 6:17
"Christina" – 3:33
"Peter Pan" – 4:39
"Rain" – 4:41
"Mad Mission" – 3:14
"Be Careful" – 4:36
"Tony" – 6:14
"Mary" – 6:22
"Fly" – 3:12
"Nobody's Cryin'" – 5:48
"10 Million Miles" – 3:14

Personnel
Patty Griffin – vocals, guitar
Doug Lancio – guitar
Michael Ramos – keyboards
David Jacques – bass
Bryan Owings – drums
Emmylou Harris – background vocals, "Mary"
Buddy Miller – background vocals, "Mary"
Julie Miller – background vocals, "Mary"

Notes

External links
Lyrics to the album on PattyNet.net

Patty Griffin albums
2003 live albums